Storemates is a web-based service designed to allow users to find available storage spaces. It was founded by Shaffique Prabatani, Ben Rogers and Jason Bryan in 2011. Storemates is considered part of the Collaborative Consumption (sharing economy) concept, in a peer-to-peer market, allowing non-utilised assets to be shared for a monetary or non-monetary return.

Users who want to list available storage space can make a posting on the Storemates website with a location, size guide and weekly renting price. Users looking to store items can search for available listings in their desired location.

History 

Shaffique Prabatani developed the concept for the website after a personal experience looking for storage space. Prabatani designed a flyer asking neighbours if they had any spare room in their houses, offering to pay a few pounds a month in return for some storage space. He posted the fliers through the letterboxes and within a week he had received 15 phone calls from friendly neighbours offering him space for his stuff in their lofts, garages and spare rooms. Prabatani, along with Ben Rogers and Jason Bryan, created an online service where people can share their space. The website appeared on BBC's Dragon's Den and BBC's Real Storage Wars.

References

External links 

2011 establishments in the United Kingdom
Online marketplaces of the United Kingdom
Internet properties established in 2011
Sharing economy